The Hudson Valley Bears were an ice hockey team in the Eastern Professional Hockey League.  They split their home games between the Mid-Hudson Civic Center in Poughkeepsie, New York and the Ice Time Sports Complex in Newburgh, New York.

History

2008-2009
The Hudson Valley Bears were founded in 2008 as an Eastern Professional Hockey League expansion team. In October 2008, weeks before the first games were scheduled, the Copper City Chiefs and New Hampshire Freeze folded endangering the ability of the season to be played. Rather than postpone the season, a replacement team was put together and named the Hudson Valley Bears, with home games at the Mid-Hudson Civic Center in Poughkeepsie, New York and the Ice Time Sports Complex in Newburgh, New York. The Bears' roster was drawn from a pool of nearly 100 "local guys with part-time jobs," as Jim Riggs, the league commissioner, put it.

The Bears had little success during their only season as they finished with a 3–45–1–1 record and last place, missing the playoffs by 54 points.  They also finished last in attendance with average attendance 235.

Roster

External links
 Hudson Valley Bears

References

Eastern Professional Hockey League (2008–09) teams
Ice hockey teams in New York (state)